Jeay Sindh Qaumi Mahaz (JSQM,  Long live Sindh National Front) is a nationalist political party in the Sindh province of Pakistan, that advocates for Sindh's independence from Pakistan. The party was founded in 1995 after death of GM Syed.

Formation
JSQM was a “merger/integration” of all the nationalist factions of Jeay Sindh or Sindhudesh movement which were functioning separately before the demise of veteran Sindhi nationalist ideologue GM Syed. The death of GM Syed in 1995, brought all the factions of the Jeay Sindh under one umbrella called JSQM, veteran Sindhi nationalist figure Abdul Wahid Aresar as its first elected chairman. This integration continued successfully for five years ahead.

Turmoil within party
In the year 2000 Shafi Muhammad Burfat along with his other like-minded fellows parted his ways from JSQM and founded JSMM. Abdul Wahid Aresar blamed Bashir Ahmed Qureshi and called him self-appointed JSQM chairman. He alleged that Bashir Qureshi, is trying to impose himself as a leader by refusing to abide by the decisions of all the institutions of the party. Later, in the year 2006, Abdul Wahid Aresar left JSQM and formed his own outfit JSQM (A). In the year 2010, Safdar Sarki (then Secretary General of JSQM) left and formed another outfit Jeay Sindh Tahreek (JST).

Leaders

Bashir Ahmed Qureshi

Bashir Ahmed Qureshi served as the party chairman from 1998 until his death in 2012.

Sanan Khan Qureshi
Sanan Khan Qureshi, the younger son of Bashir Ahmed Qureshi led the party's affairs as chairperson after death of Bashir Ahmed Qureshi. Critics also see the placement of Sannan Khan as the Chairman of JSQM as the monarchist coronation and against the democratic values introduced by Syed himself.

See also

Sindhudesh Liberation Army
Khaliq Junejo
Sindhi people

References

Political parties in Pakistan
Political parties established in 1995
Separatism in Pakistan
Sindhi nationalism